Louise Juliette Talma (October 31, 1906August 13, 1996) was an American composer, academic, and pianist. After studies in New York and in France, piano with Isidor Philipp and composition with Nadia Boulanger, she focused on composition from 1935. She taught at the American Conservatory in Fontainebleau, and at Hunter College. Her opera The Alcestiad was the first full-scale opera by an American woman staged in Europe. She was the first women in the National Institute of Arts and Letters and being awarded the Sibelius Medal for Composition.

Career 
Born in Arcachon in France to an American mother, Alma Cecile Garrigues, a professional soprano who took the name Cecile Talma around 1900, and a father whose identity remains unknown. Mother and daughter returned to the United States in 1914, settling in New York City. Talma grew up surrounded by music but was also an excellent science student and considered becoming a chemist before deciding on a career as a musician. After graduating from Wadleigh High School, Talma entered the Institute of Musical Arts (now Juilliard) in New York in 1922, where she studied both piano and composition. She later earned a Bachelor of Music degree from New York University in 1931 and a master's degree from Columbia in 1933. She studied chemistry at Columbia University, and simultaneously piano and composition at the Institute of Musical Arts (which became the Juilliard School) from 1922 to 1930. She received her bachelor of music degree from New York University and masters of arts degree from Columbia University. She studied piano with Isidor Philipp at the American Conservatory in Fontainebleau, France, every summer from 1926 to 1935. From 1928, she studied annually composition with Nadia Boulanger, deciding in 1935 to focus on composition. She continued the studies with Boulanger until 1939. Talma taught at Hunter College of the City University of New York from the late 1920s.

In 1926, after making a successful debut as a concert pianist in New York, Talma spent her first summer at the American Conservatory in Fontainebleau, France, where she met pedagogue Nadia Boulanger. Under Boulanger's guidance, Talma gave up her piano studies in order to focus on composition, converted from agnosticism to Roman Catholicism in 1934 with Boulanger as her godmother, and adopted a lifestyle similar to Boulanger's in its devotion to music. While many of her early works express desire for an unattainable beloved (likely Boulanger), she also composed more than 20 religious works after her conversion, setting a number of sacred texts and spiritual writings. Talma's copious correspondence reveals several passionate affairs with women, including one in late life with Ethelston (Eth) Chapman, who had been a fellow student in Fontainebleau with Talma. She never married. 

Talma's first pieces show an interest in neo-classical approaches and techniques and appear to be highly autobiographical, establishing compositional patterns that would continue throughout her career. Speaking of her creative life, Talma identified three periods: her early works, which were composed during her “neo-classical period,” 1925–1951; her “serial period,” 1952–1967; and her “non-serial atonal period,” 1967–1996. However, after adopting serial methods in 1952, the majority of her works even in this last period owe something to serial approaches, especially in terms of melody creation.

Talma's Piano Sonata No. 1 (1943), Toccata for Orchestra (1944) and Alleluia in the Form of Toccata for piano (1945) were highly praised by critics and helped establish Talma as an important American composer at the beginning of her career. Based in part on the success of these works, she was the second woman (after Ruth Crawford Seeger in 1930) to receive a Guggenheim Fellowship in music composition and the first woman awarded back-to-back Guggenheims in 1946 and 1947. In the 1940s Talma also began spending each summer at the MacDowell Colony in Peterborough, New Hampshire, where most of her mature works were composed. Talma was a full-time member of the music faculty at Hunter College in New York from 1928 until 1979, during which time she helped author two harmony textbooks for her students.

In 1952, Talma heard Irving Fine's serial but tonally-centered string quartet and immediately began working with serial approaches and techniques in her works. Although she stated that her serial period primarily extended from 1952 to 1967, the majority of her works up until her death engaged with some form of serial practice. Her setting of e. e. cummings's “Let’s Touch the Sky” was her first completed serial work; her String Quartet (1954), Piano Sonata No. 2 (1955), and La Corona (1955), a setting of John Donne's Holy Sonnets all use clearly audible serial elements. As she developed her own compositional voice using serial elements, Talma created rows that allowed for tonal centering as well as more traditional, stricter use of pitch class sets.

Talma began working on a grand opera with writer Thornton Wilder in 1954 after the two had met while working at the MacDowell Colony. They considered several scenarios before deciding to base the opera on Wilder's existing stage play about the Greek figure Alcestis. Composed while Talma was in residence at the American Academy in Rome and at the MacDowell Colony, The Alcestiad was completed in 1958. Although several American opera houses, including the Lyric Opera in Chicago, the Met, and the San Francisco Opera, expressed interest in the work, all of them deemed it too difficult for American performers and audiences. Wilder had previously enjoyed considerable success in Germany, and Die Alkestiade was premiered by the Oper Frankfurt in 1962. It was the first time full-scale opera by an American woman was performed at a major European theatre. However, perhaps due to the enormous resources the work requires, and despite the fact that it was critically and publicly well-received, it remains relatively unknown. Nonetheless, The Alcestiad secured Talma a place in the ranks of ground-breaking American and female composers; in 1963 she was the first female composer to win the Harriet Cohen International Music Award; and in 1974 was the first woman elected to the American Academy and Institute of Arts and Letters.

Talma's extensive body of works include vocal and choral pieces and works for solo piano, chamber ensembles, and orchestra, as well as a chamber opera, and settings of texts by Auden, Browning, Dickinson, Donne, Hopkins, Keats, Marlowe, Shakespeare, Stevens, Wyatt, and others. Talma dedicated several works to John F. Kennedy after his assassination, including Dialogues for piano and orchestra (1964) and A Time to Remember (1967), an oratorio that sets Kennedy's own words. The Tolling Bell, Talma's setting of texts by Shakespeare, Marlowe, and Donne for baritone and orchestra, was completed in 1969 and nominated for the Pulitzer Prize in music. Talma wrote her own libretto for her 1976 chamber opera, Have You Heard? Do You Know?, a work about the Cold War and the desire for utopias; and continued to compose prolifically into her eighties. She died in Saratoga Springs, New York while working on an elegiac piece, The Lengthening Shadows, while in residence at the Yaddo colony.

A full-length study of Talma's music by musicologist Kendra Preston Leonard, Louise Talma: A Life in Composition, was published in 2014.

List of works 

Opera

 The Alcestiad, to a libretto by Thornton Wilder, premiered by the Oper Frankfurt on March 1, 1962 as Die Alkestiade in German

Orchestra

 Toccata (1944)
 Dialogues for piano and orchestra (1963–1964)
 The Tolling Bell for baritone and orchestra (1967–1969) (after Shakespeare, Marlowe, Donne)
 Full Circle (1985)

Chamber
 Wedding Piece: Where Thou Goest I Go for organ (1946)
 Song and Dance for violin and piano (1951)
 String Quartet (1954)
 Violin Sonata (1962)
 Three Duologues for clarinet and piano (1968)
 Summer Sounds for clarinet and string quartet (1973)
 Lament for cello and piano (1980)
 Studies in Spacing for three winds and piano (1982)
 Ambient Air for flute, violin, cello & piano (1983)
 Fanfare for Hunter College for two trumpets and three trombones (1983)
 Seven Episodes for flute, piano and violin (1987)
 Conversations for flute and piano (1987)
 Spacings for viola and piano (1994)

Piano
 Two Dances (1934)
 Four-handed Fun (1939)
 Piano Sonata No. 1 (1943)
 Italian Suite (1946)
 Venetian Folly: Overture and Barcarolle (1946–47)
 Alleluia in the Form of a Toccata (1947)
 Pastoral Prelude (1949)
 Six Etudes (1954)
 Piano Sonata No. 2 (1955)
 Passacaglia and Fugue (1955)
 Three Bagatelles (1955)
 Soundshots (1974)
 Textures (1977)
 Kaleidoscopic Variations (1984)
 Ave Atque Vale (1989)

Vocal
 Song of the Songless after Meredith (1928)
 Five Sonnets from the Portuguese after E. B. Browning (1934)
 Late Leaves after Landor (1934)
 Never Seek to Tell Thy Love after Blake (1934)
 A Child's Fancy, song cycle after Edith Gould (1935)
 I Fear a Man of Scanty Speech after Dickinson (1938)
 Seven Songs for Voice and Piano
 One need not be a Chamber to be Haunted after Dickinson (1941) 
 Leap Before You Look after W. H. Auden (1945)
 Sonnet after G. M. Hopkins (1946)
 Spring & Fall: To a young child after G. M. Hopkins (1946)
 Glory to God for Dappled Things after G. M. Hopkins) (1949)
 Sonnet after G. M. Hopkins (1950)
 Rain Song (Garrigue) (1973)
 Terre de France, song cycle (1945)
 La Corona, Holy Sonnets of John Donne for voice and piano) (1951–54)
 Birthday Song after Edmund Spencer for tenor, flute and viola (1960)
 Have You Heard? Do You Know? for soprano, mezzo-soprano and instrumental ensemble (1976)
 13 Ways of Looking at a Blackbird after Wallace Stevens for tenor or soprano and oboe, flute or violin, and piano (1979)
 Diadem after Confucius for tenor and Pierrot ensemble (1980)
 Wishing Well Francisco Tanzes for soprano and flute (1986)
 Infanta Marina, song cycle after Wallace Stevens for soprano (1990)
 The Lengthening Shadows after Donne, Keats, Landor and Hopkins (1993)

References

 Kendra Preston Leonard, Louise Talma: A Life in Composition (Ashgate, 2014).
 Kendra Preston Leonard, The Art Songs of Louise Talma (College Music Society/Routledge, 2017).

External links 

 Talma Society: Louise Talma Biography including an interview by Luann Dragone
 
 Classics Today review: Louise Talma, CRI 833
 Composer Louise Talma / A Conversation with Bruce Duffie, March 1986. Also translated into Japanese and posted
 Music of Louise Talma / (1906–1996) newworldrecords.org
 Kendra Preston Leonard: Louise Talma / A Life in Composition routledge.com
 Louise Talma Papers. Yale Collection of American Literature, Beinecke Rare Book and Manuscript Library.

1906 births
1996 deaths
20th-century classical composers
20th-century women composers
20th-century American women musicians
20th-century American composers
American classical composers
American opera composers
American women classical composers
Women opera composers
Musicians from New York City
American Conservatory alumni
Columbia Graduate School of Arts and Sciences alumni
Hunter College faculty
Juilliard School alumni
MacDowell Colony fellows
Members of the American Academy of Arts and Letters
Steinhardt School of Culture, Education, and Human Development alumni
Classical musicians from New York (state)
French emigrants to the United States
People from Arcachon
Pupils of Isidor Philipp